Uriah Adolphus Ashley Maclean (1 February 1944 – 25 November 2020) was a Panamanian Roman Catholic bishop.

Maclean was born in Panama and was ordained to the priesthood in 1979. He served as bishop of the Roman Catholic Diocese of Penonomé, Panama, from 1993 to 2015. He then served as titular bishop of Agbia and auxiliary bishop of the Roman Catholic Archdiocese of Panama, Panama, from 2015 to 2019.

Notes

1944 births
2020 deaths
20th-century Roman Catholic bishops in Panama
21st-century Roman Catholic bishops in Panama
Roman Catholic bishops of Penonomé